Troy is a city in and the county seat of Miami County, Ohio, United States, located  north of Dayton. The population was 26,305 at the 2020 census, making it the largest city in Miami County and the 55th largest city in Ohio; it is part of the Dayton Metropolitan Statistical Area. Troy is home to an annual Strawberry Festival the first weekend in June.

History
Troy was platted ca. 1807. A post office in Troy has been in operation since 1824.

Troy was one of the cities impacted by severe flooding in the Great Flood of 1913.

A definitive book on the history of Troy titled "Troy: The Nineteenth Century" was authored and published by Thomas Bemis Wheeler and the Troy Historical Society in January, 1970. Copies are still available online and through the organization. Detailed events include the founding of the city and the Ohio canal era of the 1800s.

Historic sites

The city was the location of the Hobart Welded Steel House Company, which might have become influential in U.S. housing, if pre-fabricated houses had succeeded in becoming popular after World War II.  The firms' homes are similar to those of the more well-known Lustron houses of the Columbus, Ohio-based Lustron Corporation (which also failed).  The Hobart firm manufactured and built 22 homes, all in Troy, 16 of which survive and are listed on the U.S. National Register of Historic Places.

Other NRHP-listed properties in Troy include four unrelated homes, a tavern, the Miami County Courthouse and Power Station, the 1859 First Presbyterian Church, and the Troy Public Square.

Geography 
Troy is located at  (40.041621, -84.208627).

Demographics 

As of 2000 the median income for a household in the city was $39,531, and the median income for a family was $46,889. Males had a median income of $35,819 versus $25,536 for females. The per capita income for the city was $19,892. About 6.4% of families and 8.2% of the population were below the poverty line, including 10.8% of those under age 18 and 6.4% of those age 65 or over.

2010 census
As of the census of 2010, there were 25,058 people, 10,353 households, and 6,600 families residing in the city. The racial makeup of the city was 90.1% White, 4.2% African American, 0.2% Native American, 2.4% Asian, 0.6% from other races, and 2.4% from two or more races. Hispanic or Latino of any race were 1.8% of the population.

There were 10,353 households, of which 33.1% had children under the age of 18 living with them, 46.1% were married couples living together, 12.9% had a female householder with no husband present, 4.7% had a male householder with no wife present, and 36.3% were non-families. 30.5% of all households were made up of individuals, and 10.6% had someone living alone who was 65 years of age or older. The average household size was 2.38 and the average family size was 2.95.

The median age in the city was 36.9 years. 25.2% of residents were under the age of 18; 7.9% were between the ages of 18 and 24; 28.1% were from 25 to 44; 25.7% were from 45 to 64; and 13.1% were 65 years of age or older. The gender makeup of the city was 48.7% male and 51.3% female.

Government 
The City of Troy is a Statutory form of Government, as described in Ohio Revised Code Sections 731 and 733.  General statutory law is the form of government of municipalities if the electorate has not adopted, by vote, one of the other forms.  In addition to a Council, a Mayor, President of Council and three principal administrators (Auditor, Treasurer and Solicitor) are chosen by the electorate.   The daily operations of the City are administered by the Mayor. The City of Troy has a Service and Safety Director who reports to and is appointed by the Mayor.  City of Troy, OH:  https://www.troyohio.gov

The Mayor, Auditor and Law Director are elected to four year terms. The City Council is elected to two year terms on odd numbered years.  President of City Council, three At-Large representatives and Ward representatives 1 through 6 are selected by the electorate.  The current Mayor and Auditor were elected in 2019 and the City Council was elected in 2017.  The current Treasurer was elected in 2017.

The Troy City Police Department is located at 124 E. Main Street. The force has 38 officers and 3 civilian employees. The department is separated into 3 divisions: Patrol, Detective and Administration, with Shawn McKinney as current Police Chief. The department moved to its current location in 1995.  Troy PD:  https://www.troyohio.gov/152/Police

The Troy Fire Department was established in 1850 with the Troy Hook & Ladder Company and the Troy Bucket Company were organized. The Fire Department of Troy was formally organized in the fall of 1857. Currently the fire department operates with three fire stations and 37 firefighter/paramedics, a training Lieutenant, 2 Assistant Chiefs and the current Fire Chief Matthew D. Simmons. The fire department provides a full complement of services to its citizens with fire/EMS/Community outreach/ specialty rescue services. The Troy Fire Department serves 74.2 square miles with the city and three townships averaging over 5,000 incidents a year. Their motto of "Exceeding the Expectations of our Community" is evident with their Fire Apprenticeship program and the Quick Response Team (QRT) for addition services.  Troy FD:  https://www.troyohio.gov/151/Fire

Education 
Troy City Schools operates public schools

The Western Ohio Japanese Language School (オハイオ西部日本語学校 Ohaio Seibu Nihongo Gakkō) is a supplementary weekend Japanese school in unincorporated Miami County, near Troy. It started in April 1988.

Troy is home to the Hobart Institute of Welding Technology, founded in 1930, one of the premier welding schools in the United States.  https://www.welding.org/?doing_wp_cron=1618705349.0841760635375976562500; https://classonewelding.com/top-welding-schools-usa/

Troy has a public library, a branch of the Troy-Miami County Public Library.

Media 
The city and surrounding area are served by a daily newspaper based in Troy, the Miami Valley Today in addition to WTJN-LP "POWER 107.1" 107.1 FM and online, at power1071.org including My Miami County.com.

Arts and culture 
Troy is home to the Troy-Hayner Cultural Center (https://www.troyhayner.org), a 1914 Romanesque mansion donated to the city by Mary Jane Harter Coleman Hayner. Hayner had been the wife of William Hayner, founder of a Dayton-based mail order whiskey business which operated prior to the Prohibition. Today, the Troy-Hayner houses the Hayner Distillery Collection  as well as a variety of works by local artists.

Notable people
 Cris Carter, former wide receiver for Ohio State and the Minnesota Vikings, member of the Football Hall of Fame
 Nancy J. Currie, engineer, United States Army officer, NASA astronaut
 Pat Darcy, former Major League Baseball player for the Cincinnati Reds
Kris Dielman, former American football guard who played for the San Diego Chargers.
 Mike Finnigan, keyboard player and vocalist, he played organ on Jimi Hendrix Electric Ladyland album.
 Bob Ferguson, played college football at The Ohio State University, where he won the Maxwell Award in 1961. Ferguson then played professionally in the National Football League (NFL) with the Pittsburgh Steelers and Minnesota Vikings. He was inducted into the College Football Hall of Fame in 1996.
 Jack Hewitt,  former driver and two-time champion in the USAC Silver Crown Series
 Tolbert Lanston, founder of Monotype 
 Miss May I, metalcore band
 Richmond Mayo-Smith, economist
 Roger A. McGuire, U.S. Ambassador to Guinea-Bissau (1992-1995)
 Sam Milby, Filipino actor
 Heath Murray, former Major League Baseball player
 Anne Rudloe, United States marine biologist
 Peter Shelton, American sculptor
 Tim Vogler, American football guard in the National Football League
 Randy Walker, American college football coach at Miami University and Northwestern University
 Bradley White, former cyclist
 Ryan Brewer, Ohio's Mr. Football 1998 he became the states all time leading rusher for a single season. In 2001 Outback Bowl playing for the University of South Carolina he was named game Most Outstanding Player and tied a game record with three touchdowns.
 Wesley Henderson (born 1951), architect, born in Troy

References

External links

 City website
 Troy Area Chamber of Commerce

Cities in Ohio
Cities in Miami County, Ohio
County seats in Ohio